Arabella Elizabeth Castro Quiñónez (born in 1955) is a Guatemalan lawyer and former politician who served as President of the Congress from 1994 to 1995 and from 1997 to 1998. She was also Minister of Education during the government of Álvaro Arzú and a candidate for Vice President in 1999, running alongside former mayor of Guatemala City Óscar Berger.

References 

1955 births
Living people
Guatemalan women lawyers
20th-century Guatemalan women politicians
20th-century Guatemalan politicians
Presidents of the Congress of Guatemala
National Advancement Party politicians
People from Huehuetenango Department
Women government ministers of Guatemala
Universidad de San Carlos de Guatemala alumni
Members of the Congress of Guatemala
20th-century Guatemalan lawyers